Carl (or Karl) Schlesinger (August 19, 1813 – 1871) was a cellist.
He originally played the violin.

From 1838 onwards, he worked as a solo cellist successively for the Pesth National Theatre in Budapest and the Imperial Opera orchestra in Vienna. He was a member of the Hellmesberger Quartet, which was formed in 1849.

In 1862 he was appointed professor of cello at the Vienna Conservatoire.

External links
Short bio 

German classical cellists
1813 births
1871 deaths
19th-century German musicians
19th-century classical musicians